Joseph Turner Patterson (1907-1969) was the thirty-fourth Attorney General of Mississippi.

Early life and education
Patterson was born July 10, 1907 in Eupora, Mississippi, Mississippi.

Public service

In 1930, Patterson was elected city attorney of Calhoun, Mississippi. In 1932, he was elected to the Mississippi House of Representatives. In 1936, he joined the staff of Senator Pat Harrison.

In 1962, Patterson cooperated with the Kennedy administration to register James Meredith to attend Ole Miss.

In 1968, he represented the state's interests in Coffey v. State Educational Finance Commission. This case marked the end of state subsidies to segregation academies.

References
Joe T. Patterson and the White South's Dilemma: Evolving Resistance to Black Advancement

|-

1907 births
1969 deaths
Mississippi Attorneys General
Mississippi Democrats
Mississippi College alumni
Cumberland School of Law alumni
People from Eupora, Mississippi